SM U-5 was a German Type U 5 U-boat built for the Imperial German Navy. She was commissioned 2 July 1910 in Germaniawerft in Kiel. She served in World War I under the command of Kptlt. Johannes Lemmer, with no recorded sinkings of enemy ships on two patrols. She was lost in an accident off the Belgian coast on 18 December 1914, and sank with no survivors - all of her 29 crew members died.

References

Bibliography

External links 
 

Type U 5 submarines
Ships built in Kiel
1910 ships
U-boats commissioned in 1910
World War I submarines of Germany
World War I shipwrecks in the North Sea
Maritime incidents in December 1914
U-boats sunk in 1914
U-boats sunk by mines